Edna Foa (born 1937, Haifa) is an Israeli professor of clinical psychology at the University of Pennsylvania, where she serves as the director of the Center for the Treatment and Study of Anxiety. Foa is an internationally renowned authority in the field of psychopathology and treatment of anxiety. She approaches the understanding and treatment of mental disorders from a cognitive-behavioral perspective.

Academic career
Foa was born to a Jewish family and earned her BA in psychology and literature from Bar Ilan University in 1962, and her MA in clinical psychology from the University of Illinois in 1970. In that same year she completed her PhD in clinical psychology and personality at the University of Missouri.

Her research, aimed at determining causes and treatments of anxiety disorders, has been highly influential. Foa is an expert in post-traumatic stress disorders (PTSD) and obsessive-compulsive disorder (OCD). The program she has developed for rape survivors is considered to be one of the most effective therapies for PTSD. She has published several books and over 200 articles and book chapters, has lectured extensively around the world, and was the chair of the PTSD work group of the DSM-IV.

Foa's research interests are development and evaluation of cognitive-behavioral treatment for obsessive compulsive disorder (OCD), post-traumatic stress disorder (PTSD), and social anxiety disorder (SAD); experimental psychopathology of anxiety disorders, especially post-traumatic stress disorder, social phobia, and obsessive-compulsive disorder; and dissemination of evidence-based treatment to mental health professionals.

Awards and honors
Foa is the recipient of numerous awards and honors, including:
 Time magazine's 100 Most Influential People in the World for 2010  
 Distinguished Scientist Award from the Scientific section of the American Psychological Association
 The First Annual Outstanding Research Contribution Award from the Association for the Advancement of Behavior Therapy (ABCT)
 The Distinguished Scientific Contributions to Clinical Psychology Award from the American Psychological Association
 Lifetime Achievement Award from the International Society for Traumatic Stress Studies
 Exemplary Contribution to the Field of Psychology and Humanity Philadelphia Society of Clinical Psychologists
 Exemplary Substance Abuse Prevention Program Award from SAMHSA/CSAP, CADCA, and NASADAD
 Annual Signature Service Award from Women Organized Against Rape
 Honorary Doctorate Degree of Philosophy by University of Basel
 The Philadelphia Behavior Therapy Association (PBTA) Lifetime Achievement Award

See also
Prolonged exposure therapy

References

External links
"Queen of Broken Hearts", Haaretz. August 6, 2010. Interview with Foa on the treatment of PTSD.

1937 births
Obsessive–compulsive disorder researchers
Israeli psychologists
Living people
Israeli women psychologists